Guillermo Rivas may refer to:

Guillermo Rivas (actor) (1927–2004), Mexican character actor
Guillermo Rivas (tennis) (born 1964), Argentine tennis player